Daiotyla is a genus of orchids native to Colombia, Panama and Costa Rica.

Daiotyla albicans (Rolfe) Dressler - Panama, Costa Rica
Daiotyla crassa (Dressler) Dressler - Panama
Daiotyla maculata (Garay) Dressler - Colombia
Daiotyla xanthina Pupulin & Dressler - Colombia

See also 
 List of Orchidaceae genera

References

External links 

Zygopetalinae genera
Zygopetalinae